Captain William Grossart (born 26 May 1896, date of death unknown) was a Scottish World War I flying ace credited with five aerial victories.

Biography
He was born in Crawfordjohn, Lanarkshire, Scotland, the son of James and Elisabeth Grossart. Grossart joined the Royal Flying Corps in late 1917 as a cadet, being appointed a temporary second lieutenant (on probation) on 17 November, and was confirmed in his rank on 25 February 1918.

On 1 April, the Army's Royal Flying Corps (RFC) and the Royal Naval Air Service (RNAS) were merged to form the Royal Air Force, and so Grossart was assigned to No. 205 Squadron RAF to fly the DH.4 two-seater day bomber.

On 3 May he shared credit with nine other aircraft of his squadron in the shooting down of two Pfalz D.IIIs over Chaulnes, and on 15 May he drove down another D.III in the same area. He gained another credit, shared with seven others, on 20 May, accounting for another D.III over Mericombe. Finally, on 11 August, he destroyed another D.III over Péronne. On 23 August he was appointed a flight commander with the acting rank of captain.

He award of the Distinguished Flying Cross was gazetted on 20 September 1918. His citation read:
Lieutenant William Grossart.
During the last two and a half months this officer has carried out twenty-seven successful bombing raids and twenty-five special photographic reconnaissances, his services on the latter duty being exceptionally valuable. This officer possesses a fine spirit of determination; neither strong opposition nor adverse weather conditions deters him from achieving his object.

Grossart left the RAF after the war, being transferred to the unemployed list on 12 April 1919.

References

1896 births
Year of death missing
People from South Lanarkshire
Royal Flying Corps officers
Royal Air Force personnel of World War I
British World War I flying aces
Scottish flying aces
Recipients of the Distinguished Flying Cross (United Kingdom)